The Anarchists in the Russian Revolution is a 1973 history book by Paul Avrich and collection of primary sources about the role of Russian anarchists during the Russian revolution.

References 

 
 
 
 
 
 
 
 

1973 non-fiction books
American history books
Books by Paul Avrich
Cornell University Press books
English-language books
History books about anarchism
History books about Russia